The Central China Loess Plateau Mixed Forests ecoregion (WWF ID: PA0411) covers an elongated plateau across north-central China, characterized by accumulated soils of wind-blown dust known as loess and glacial till.  The yellowish soil imparts its color to the Yellow River and Yellow Sea downstream.  The ecoregion is located west of the lower Yellow River basin and the North China Plain.

Location and description 
The ecoregion runs about 1,600 km from southwest to northeast, and is about 300 km wide. The loess soil is up to 200 meters thick, with the greatest depths in the southwest, where consolidated loess can be formed into mountains.  Thinner deposits are in the northeast where the loess only fills basins.   Because loess retains nutrients and water well, the soil can support vegetation through dry seasons.

Climate 
The climate of the ecoregion is Humid continental climate, warm summer (Köppen climate classification (Dwb)), with a dry winter.

Flora and fauna 
The plateau supports mixed deciduous broadleaf forests in the northern and eastern areas, although vegetation gets more sparse and poor towards the southwest. Conversion of forest to agriculture over time has led to erosion and loss of vegetation, which has been severe in some areas.  The general belief is that the area was once heavily forested with tall trees, however recent research suggests that much of the area may have been grassland at times in the past 20,000 years.  

Since the 1950s the government has heavily supported tree-planting programs for erosion control in the region, converting unproductive agricultural land on steep slopes to forest.

References 

Forests of China
Ecoregions of China
Palearctic ecoregions
Temperate broadleaf and mixed forests